This is a list of queens consort of Norway. This list covers a large time span and the role of a queen has changed much over the centuries, with some individual queens also shaping their own roles. Many have ruled the country side by side with their husband and some have become sole regents. The marriage of an heir or a king was most often affected by politics and alliances were often affirmed by marriages in the royal families. It was also not permitted for a long period for royalty to marry non-royalty. Thus the choice of wife would be narrow in one's own country and most of the queens in this list are not native to their husband's country.
Due to unions with Denmark and Sweden the queens listed for 1380–1814 were also queens of Denmark and the queens listed for 1814–1905 were also queens of Sweden.

Fairhair dynasty

Knýtling dynasty

Unclassified

Knýtling dynasty

St. Olaf dynasty

Knýtling dynasty

Hardrada dynasty

Gille dynasty

Hardrada (Skakke) dynasty

Sverre dynasty

House of Bjelbo

House of Pomerania

House of Palatinate-Neumarkt

House of Bonde

House of Oldenburg

House of Holstein-Gottorp

House of Bernadotte

House of Glücksburg

See also
 List of Norwegian monarchs

References

Norwegian queens
Norway
Queens
Norway